Live and Well is a live album by Dolly Parton, released on September 14, 2004. It was recorded during her 2002 Halos & Horns Tour, her first in years; the performances on December 12 and 13, 2002 were used. A DVD of the concert was released simultaneously with the album.

Critical reception

Will Harris of PopMatters writes, "Live and Well is a document of Parton's 2002 tour, released simultaneously on CD and DVD, and, unlike a lot of live albums, this is a proper souvenir of one of her concerts, complete with the chatter between numbers that's so often cut from live records. Obviously, this is good news for her fans, many of who probably weren't able to catch one of those performances (she only did 14 shows); for others, however, it has its ups and downs."

Uncut says, "the return-to-the-mountain bluegrass of recent years ("The Grass Is Blue", "Shine", "Little Sparrow", "I'm Gone") is brilliantly served by one of the most irresistible forces in the history of country."

David McPherson of Exclaim! writes in his review that, "Live and Well confirms that musically and physically Parton is just that; as this country crooner approaches 60, she is still as energetic and youthful as ever."

The Austin Chronicle's Christopher Gray writes, "Ebullient as ever, Parton's banter is as much fun as the music; cornier than an Iowa silo, she's full of zingers."

Track listing

The DVD track list is the same as the one for the CD with the exception that the first two songs on the DVD ("Orange Blossom Special" and "Train, Train") are listed as a single track.
Track information verified from the album's liner notes.

Charts

Personnel
Dolly Parton - vocals
The Blueniques
 Gary Davis - banjo, acoustic guitar
 Richard Dennison - acoustic guitar, keyboards, vocals
 Randy Kohrs - resonator guitar, vocals
 Jimmy Mattingly - fiddle
 Brent Truitt - mandolin
 Steve Turner - drums
 Jay Weaver - acoustic bass guitar
 Kent Wells - acoustic guitar, vocals

References

External links
Live & Well at dollyon-line.com

2004 live albums
Dolly Parton live albums
Sugar Hill Records live albums